Hingangaon is a village and Gram panchayat in Kavathe Mahankal, Sangli district of Maharashtra, India. It is located near the Maharashtra-Karnataka border and is approximately 10 km from the Miraj-Pandharpur highway, 50 km from Sangli........

Location 
Hingangaon is situated on the banks of the river Agrani(अग्रणी), about 3 km south to Kavathe Mahankal. near to Karnataka border is 25 km away from this village.

Demography 
According to 2011 census:

Population: 4832

Family 1035

Sex ratio: 999

Literacy: 83.34%

Children(0-6 age): 455 (9.42%)

Child Sex ratio: 827

Art and culture 
Hingangaon having an old-style fortified stone house, called "WADA" in Marathi still constructed as a community work.

Hingangaon is famous for God Vithala Narayan festival which is part of 15th century  movement in Maharashtra

Hanuman temple is situated to the North of the village. It celebrates an annual fair in December in the month of Margashirsha. 
Yallamma temple is situated to the South of the village. It celebrates an annual fair on Chaitra Purnima (Full Moon) in the month of Margashirsha.

Girling a Hill Shiva temple from this village about 12 km,

Climate 
Hingangaon has a semi-arid climate with three seasons, a hot, dry summer from the middle of February to the middle of June, a monsoon from the middle of June to late October and a mild cool season from early November to early February. The total rainfall is about 22 inches (580 mm).

Economy 
The village is particularly known for "Teacher village" most of the  people from this village 
opted for the profession as working employment for example teaching, army, Engineers 
doctors another workforce in agriculture, Other work
includes painting, construction, Plumbing, Handcraft.
A new  Textile Industries started in this village as Payod industries, which added employment to household women

Schools
 Shri Narayan Tatoba Sagare Vidyalaya, Hingangaon (S.N.T.S.V.H.)
 Zilha Parishad Primary School, Hingangaon

Transport 
Transport is mainly carried by the government buses of M.S.R.T.C. via two main centres viz. Kavathe Mahankal and Miraj.
Some private means like taxis, trucks are also available. Locals use bicycles, two-wheelers and four-wheelers.

Air : Nearest airport is Kolhapur but not fully integrated for domestic flight, therefore Pune is nearest Airport about 250 km away.
Rail : Nearest railway station is in Kavathe Mahankal about 15 km away.
Road : Roads are good. Road connectivity is good especially to Kavathe Mahankal and Athani(KA) (via सलगरे)

See also 
Kavathe Mahankal
Sangli
Kolhapur

गावाबद्दल बोलू काही.. 
माझा गाव बदलतोय!

  हिंगणगाव- अग्रणी नदीच्या काठावर माझं गावं टुमदार वसलय!
  साडेचार हजार लोकसंख्या; अठरा पगड जाती; मरगुबाई, मारुती, महादेव, विठ्ठल, नृसिंह, लक्ष्मी, बिरोबा, यल्लमा, दत्त, गणपती, प्रभूस्वामी, भगवान महावीर इ.देवतांची मंदिरे येथे आहेत, शिवाय मुस्लिम समाजाचे पिराचे देवस्थान आहे.
        गाव तसा पहिल्यापासून बागायतदार! एके काळी हळद, ऊस यांचे पिक घेणारा गाव आज द्राक्ष बागायतदारांचा गाव ही स्वतंत्र ओळख निर्माण केली आहे. म्हैसाळ योजनेचे पाणी आल्यामुळे इथला शेतकरी संपन्न झाला आहे. अग्रणी नदीवर गांवाच्या हद्दीत तीन बंधारे झाले आहेत.
      गावात तरुण मंडळे आहेत. अतिशय उत्तम विचारसरणी असलेले तरुण हे माझ्या गावचे वैभव आहे. गावाच्या मध्यावर ग्रामसचिवालय आहे, त्यामुळे गावाची भव्यता स्पष्ट होते.
       स्वर्गातील नंदनवन कुणीही पाहिलं नाही परंतु माझा गाव त्याहून सुंदर आहे!प्रत्येक चौकाची रचना एखाद्या शिल्पकारालाही अचंबित करायला लावणारी आहे.
        आता गावात रस्त्यांची कामे सुरू आहेत. सतरा लाख रुपयांची कामे सुरू आहेत (सप्टेंबर २०१९), शिवाय परत पन्नास लाख रुपये फक्त रस्त्यांसाठी मंजूर झाली आहेत.
        ग्रामपंचायत मार्फत अनेक उपक्रम राबविले जातात; शिक्षण, आरोग्य, शुद्ध पाणी पुरवठा; महान नेत्यांच्या जयंत्या साजऱ्या केल्या जातात; महिलांना वेगवेगळ्या व्यवसायांचे प्रशिक्षण दिले जाते.
         गेल्या चार वर्षांपासून लोकजागर साहित्य संमेलन भरवले जाते. त्यालाच जोडून हाँलीबाँल सामने घेतले जातात, ज्या गावाला या खेळाची पंढरी मानली जाते! साहित्य संमेलनामुळे वैचारिक बैठक तयार करण्याचे काम इथला तरुण मन लाऊन करत आहे, विशेष म्हणजे या साहित्य संमेलनाला लोकाश्रय मिळाला आहे. याचा सार्थ अभिमान वाटतो.
        एके काळी माझा गाव शिक्षकांचा गाव म्हणून ओळखला जात होता आज तोच गाव डॉक्टर, इंजिनिअर, अधिकारी आणि प्रयोगशील शेतकर्यांचा म्हणून ओळखला जात आहे!
        उत्तम विचारसरणी, उत्तम संस्कार असलेला माझा गाव आज काळानुसार बदलत आहे. रस्ते झाले, शाळा सुधारणा झाली, भौतिक सुखं भरपूर झाली. आता मला भिती वाटते ती वेगळीच आहे. जेव्हा सोईसुविधा यांची रेलचेल होते तेंव्हा संस्कृती टिकत नाही तो टिकवून ठेवणं अतिशय महत्त्वाचे आहे!
       सरपंच शामराव इरळे, उपसरपंच शिंत्रे गुरुजी आणि सर्व ग्रामपंचायत सदस्य अभिनंदनास पात्र आहे, खूप चांगले काम करत आहेत, हे सर्व यश येण्यासाठी त्यांची अविरत धडपड सुरू आहे. मला त्यांच्या कर्तबगारीचा अभिमान वाटतो!
        मला खात्री आहे माझ्या गावचा तरुण या बाबतीत कुठेही कमी पडणार नाही,

    -महादेव माळी, हिंगणगाव

References 

Cities and towns in Sangli district